is an interchange passenger railway station located in the city of Kawachinagano, Osaka Prefecture, Japan,  jointly operated by the private railway operators Kintetsu Railway and Nankai Electric Railway.

Lines

Nankai Railway Koya Line

Layout
Nankai station has two island platforms serving four tracks on the ground.

Adjacent stations

Kintetsu Nagano Line

Layout
Kintetsu station has an island platform serving two tracks on the ground; however, all trains arrive at and depart from Track 2. Track 1 is unused by revenue trains (though it is sometimes used to park track maintenance equipment), and has neither a departure signal nor overhead catenary. Much of the track-space has been cannibalized for the use of stairs and elevator to the concourse above the platform.

Adjacent station

Passenger statistics
In fiscal 2019, the Nankai portion of the station was used by an average of 26,916 passengers daily. The Kintetsu portion of the station was used by 7,001 passengers daily (boarding passengers only)

Surrounding area

Public facilities
Kawachinagano City Hall (1 km from the station)
Lovely Hall
Kawachinagano Police Station (Osaka Prefectural Police)
Kawachinagano Fire Station (Kawachinagano City Fire Department)

Market facilities
Izumiya

Financial institutes
Japan Post Group
Kawachinagano Post Office
bank, etc.
The Bank of Tokyo-Mitsubishi UFJ Kawachinagano Branch
Sumitomo Mitsui Banking Corporation Kawachinagano Branch
Kiyo Bank Kawachinagano Branch
Nanto Bank Kawachinagano Branch
Seikyo Shin'yo Kumiai Kawachinagano Branch

See also
List of railway stations in Japan

References

External links

Kawachinagano Station from Nankai Electric Railway website  
 Kawachi-Nagano Station from Kintetsu Railway website  

Railway stations in Japan opened in 1898
Railway stations in Japan opened in 1902
Railway stations in Osaka Prefecture
Kawachinagano